Boris van Schuppen (born 22 November 2001) is a Dutch professional footballer who plays as a midfielder for Eerste Divisie club NAC Breda.

Career
Born in Breda, North Brabant, Van Schuppen started playing football for local clubs Irene '58 and JEKA, before he was admitted to the NAC Breda youth academy in 2012. He signed his first professional contract in February 2021. 

Van Schuppen made his professional debut on 8 August 2021 on the opening day of the 2021–22 Eerste Divisie. He started the away game against VVV-Venlo on the bench, but head coach Edwin de Graaf gave him his debut in the 79th minute when he came on for Pjotr Kestens. In injury time, Van Schuppen also scored his first goal to secure a 2–2 draw. He made 41 appearances during his first professional season in which he scored six goals as NAC missed out on promotion in the play-offs after two losses to ADO Den Haag.

Career statistics

References

2001 births
Living people
Footballers from Breda
Dutch footballers
Association football midfielders
NAC Breda players
Eerste Divisie players